Cosmopterix aphranassa is a moth in the family Cosmopterigidae. It was described by Edward Meyrick in 1926. It is found on Rapa Iti.

References

Moths described in 1926
aphranassa